John Constable was an English Member of Parliament for Nottinghamshire in April 1554.

References

Year of birth missing
16th-century deaths
English MPs 1554